José David Enamorado Gómez (born 13 January 1999) is a Colombian professional footballer who plays as a left winger for Independiente Santa Fe, on loan from Real Cartagena.

Career

Club career
Enamorado started playing football at Real Costa Hermosa (2014–2015) and later he played at the Escuela Barranquillera (2015–2016).

He started his senior career with Orsomarso, which he joined in mid-2016, and made his debut in the Categoría Primera B on 30 September 2016 against Tigres at the age of 17. The young winger made 44 league appearances for Orsomarso from 2016 until the end of the 2018 season.

After good performances in the 2019 South American U-20 Championship with the Colombian U-20 national team in January 2019, Enamorado was close to join Argentine club Racing Club. However, he instead ended up joining Categoría Primera A club La Equidad on loan for the 2019 season. However, due to lack of playing time, the loan was cut short and Enamorado returned to Orsomarso in the summer 2019.

On 5 January 2020, Enamorado joined Categoría Primera A club Deportivo Cali on a one-year loan with an option to buy. In December 2020, Enamorado signed with Real Cartagena. In July 2022, Enamorado was loaned out to Independiente Santa Fe until June 2023.

References

External links
 

Living people
1999 births
Association football wingers
Colombian footballers
Colombia youth international footballers
Colombia under-20 international footballers
People from Barranquilla
Orsomarso S.C. footballers
La Equidad footballers
Deportivo Cali footballers
Real Cartagena footballers
Independiente Santa Fe footballers
Categoría Primera A players
Categoría Primera B players